Carneros Creek may refer to:

Watercourses
Carneros Creek (Monterey County, California), Monterey County, California, United States
Carneros Creek (Napa River), tributary to the Napa River, Napa County, California, United States
Carneros Creek (Santa Barbara County, California), Santa Barbara County, California, United States
Carneros Creek (Santos Creek), San Luis Obispo and Kern Counties, California, United States